Mário Mihál (born 27 February 2001) is a Slovak footballer who plays for MŠK Považská Bystrica, on loan from Spartak Trnava, as a centre back.

Club career

FK Senica
Mihál was elevated into the first team of Senica was facing financial issues in the winter of 2019/20 and had released most of their first squad foreign players. Mihál made his professional Fortuna Liga debut for Senica against DAC Dunajská Streda on 16 February 2020. Mihál had made a debut in the starting-XI in a goal-less game played in MOL Aréna, with the result being hailed as surprising, considering the winter break developments in Senica, as most of the squad had played for youth teams until that point.

References

External links
 FK Senica official club profile 
 Futbalnet profile 
 
 

2001 births
Living people
People from Senica District
Sportspeople from the Trnava Region
Slovak footballers
Association football defenders
FK Senica players
FC Spartak Trnava players
FC Petržalka players
MFK Tatran Liptovský Mikuláš players
MŠK Považská Bystrica (football) players
Slovak Super Liga players
2. Liga (Slovakia) players